(born February 2, 1965) is a retired Japanese professional wrestler and former mixed martial artist most notable for being the generational rival of legendary Japanese pro wrestler Jushin Liger. During the last years of his career he went by the name .

Professional wrestling career

New Japan Pro-Wrestling (1984–1990, 2020)
Sano was a member of the 1984 NJPW Dojo class, and in his first few years wrestled in preliminary matches. In 1987, he went on an overseas excursion to Mexico, wrestling for the Universal Wrestling Association (UWA). In August 1987, he won his first championship, the Distrito Federal Trios Championship with fellow NJPW wrestlers Hirokazu Hata and Yoshihiro Asai. Upon his return to the promotion in January 1989, he won the Young Tokyo Dome Cup on April 24, becoming the first NJPW wrestler to wrestle inside the Tokyo Dome, along with Hiro Saito. He went on to have numerous acclaimed matches against Jyushin Liger. Sano defeated Liger for the IWGP Junior Heavyweight Championship on August 10, 1989, but lost it to Liger on January 31, 1990. In April 1990, he went on an overseas excursion to Canada, wrestling under the name Mr. Sato for the Canadian National Wrestling Alliance promotion in Calgary, where he won the promotion's World Mid-Heavyweight Championship.

Sano returned to NJPW in January 2020, at their Wrestle Kingdom 14 events. On January 5, he and Jushin Liger were defeated by Hiromu Takahashi and Ryu Lee, after which Liger retired. Two days later on January 7, Sano retired.

Super World of Sports and Pro Wrestling Fujiwara Gumi (1990–1992)
During his Canadian excursion in July 1990, Sano moved to the Super World of Sports (SWS) after a big money offer from Megane Super, the company backing the promotion. In SWS he became the top junior heavyweight, feuding with native talent and outsider talent from the United States, Mexico, and outsider promotions Universal Lucha Libre and Pro Wrestling Fujiwara Gumi. In December 1991, Sano won the tournament for the SWS Light Heavyweight Championship. He was the only titleholder.

After SWS collapsed in June 1992, Sano worked a few matches for Pro Wrestling Fujiwara Gumi, but soon moved to Union of Wrestling Force International (UWFI) upon recommendation from former NJPW comrades Nobuhiko Takada and Kazuo Yamazaki, the top stars of UWFI.

UWF International (1992–1996)
In UWFI, he adopted the name Yuhi Sano. Adopting the shinguards and trunks typical of shoot style wrestlers, Sano had more opportunities to face actual heavyweights. Nevertheless, during the 1995-96 feud against NJPW, Sano participated on UWFI's side, beating old rival Liger one more time but losing to Shinya Hashimoto. In the feud against the WAR promotion, which had been born out of the ashes of SWS, Sano lost to old patron Genichiro Tenryu in a singles match. Upon UWFI's collapse later in December 1996, Sano joined its successor promotion, Kingdom.

Independent circuit (1997–2001)
He returned to wrestling, entering Battlarts and feuding with Minoru Tanaka over the Independent World Junior Heavyweight Championship. Sano won the belt from Tanaka in May 1999 and dropped it to him the following year. In 2000 he participated in the third Super J-Cup tournament held by Michinoku Pro Wrestling. He advanced to the final four before losing to eventual runner-up Cima.

Pro Wrestling Noah (2001–2012)
In 2001, he joined Pro Wrestling Noah. He became Takuma Sano, for a year wearing tights and wrestling junior heavyweights, but after fully turning heavyweight, he returned to the shinguards and trunks. As part of the faction led by Akira Taue and also composed of Daisuke Ikeda, Sano had opportunities for the GHC Heavyweight Championship held by Kenta Kobashi and later, Mitsuharu Misawa, but failed both times. In 2010, he teamed with Yoshihiro Takayama to win the Global Tag League. On September 18, 2010, Sano and Takayama defeated Akitoshi Saito and Bison Smith to win the vacant GHC Tag Team Championship. They would lose the title to New Japan Pro-Wrestling's Giant Bernard and Karl Anderson on June 18, 2011, at Dominion 6.18 in a match contested also for the IWGP Tag Team Championship. After his contract with NOAH expired in January 2012, Sano became a freelancer.

Mixed martial arts career
As a former UWF-i member, Sano was also a mixed martial artist and participated in the Pride Fighting Championships, which were originally created to pit Sano's trainer Nobuhiko Takada and Rickson Gracie. Sano debuted at Pride 2, where he faced Rickson's brother Royler. The Brazilian opened the fight by taking Yuhi down and mounting him, only to Sano to sweep him aside and block a triangle choke attempt before returning to standing position. Sano blocked a takedown, but was swept by Royler and the jiu-jitsu expert gained top position, though he was unable to finish him due to Yuhi's defensive skills. After Yuhi swept him again, Royler tried another triangle choke and managed to draw blood from Sano with upkicks and strikes from the guard. The end of the fight came when Royler finally took his back and performed an armbar to make Sano submit.

In October of that year at Pride 4, Sano faced a striker instead of a grappler, in the shape of Shooto's karate stylist Satoshi Honma. Sano resisted his punches and clinched knees and took Honma down, but the karateka kept hitting from the guard and nullified his offensive. Back to standing, Honma struck Sano with more punches and knees, cutting Yuhi's eyes and delivering a hard punishment before the referee called the knockout in Honma's favour. Sano had his last fight for Pride at Pride 9, being submitted by Carlos Newton in a short bout. In addition to his active career, Sano helped train fighters at the Takada Dojo.

Mixed martial arts record

|-
| Loss
| align=center| 0–4
| Carlos Newton
| Submission (armbar)
| Pride 9
| 
| align=center| 1
| align=center| 0:40
| Nagoya, Japan
|
|-
| Loss
| align=center| 0–3
| Keiichiro Yamamiya
| TKO (strikes)
| Pancrase - Breakthrough 3
| 
| align=center| 1
| align=center| 10:43
| Tokyo, Japan
|
|-
| Loss
| align=center| 0–2
| Satoshi Honma
| TKO (punches)
| Pride 4
| 
| align=center| 1
| align=center| 9:25
| Tokyo, Japan
|
|-
| Loss
| align=center| 0–1
| Royler Gracie
| Submission (armbar)
| PRIDE 2
| 
| align=center| 1
| align=center| 33:14
| Yokohama, Kanagawa, Japan
|

Championships and accomplishments
Canadian National Wrestling Alliance
CNWA World Mid-Heavyweight Championship (1 time)
Comision de Box y Lucha D.F.
Distrito Federal Trios Championship (1 time) - with Yoshihiro Asai and Hata Hirokazu
Frontier Martial-Arts Wrestling
FMW World Junior Heavyweight Championship (1 time)
Kingdom
Kingdom One Million Yen Tournament Winner - August 1997
New Japan Pro-Wrestling
IWGP Junior Heavyweight Championship (1 time)
Young Lion Tournament (1989)
Pro Wrestling Noah
GHC Tag Team Championship (1 time) – with Yoshihiro Takayama
Global Tag League (2010) - with Yoshihiro Takayama
Global League Technique Award (2010)
Super World of Sports
SWS Light Heavyweight Championship (1 time)
Wrestle Association R
WAR World Six-Man Tag Team Championship (1 time) – with Nobuhiko Takada and Masahito Kakihara
WAR World Six-Man Tag Team Championship Tournament (1996) – with Nobuhiko Takada and Masahito Kakihara
Wrestling Observer Newsletter
Match of the Year (1990) vs. Jyushin Thunder Liger on January 31 in Osaka, Japan

References

External links
 
 

Japanese male mixed martial artists
Mixed martial artists utilizing wrestling
Japanese male professional wrestlers
Living people
1965 births
Place of birth missing (living people)
IWGP Junior Heavyweight champions
GHC Tag Team Champions
Independent World Junior Heavyweight Champions
20th-century professional wrestlers
21st-century professional wrestlers
Tenryu Project World 6-Man Tag Team Champions